Olaf Liljekrans is an 1856 play by Henrik Ibsen.

External links

1856 plays
Plays by Henrik Ibsen